The following is a list of films produced in the Malayalam film industry in India in 2009.

Malayalam films

Notable deaths

References

 2009
2009
Lists of 2009 films by country or language
2009 in Indian cinema